Emil Ludwig Benko (November 9, 1913 – November 14, 2007), sometimes incorrectly listed as "Danko" in sports encyclopedias, was an American professional basketball player. He played in the National Basketball League for the Hammond Ciesar All-Americans in one game and scored four points.

Early life
Benko attended Whiting High School. He served in the United States Army Air Forces during World War II, and was honorably discharged as a staff sergeant on October 23, 1944. He served with the 933rd Engineer Aviation Regiment on Ascension Island March 30, 1942 – February 26, 1944.

References

1913 births
2007 deaths
American men's basketball players
United States Army Air Forces personnel of World War II
Basketball players from Indiana
Guards (basketball)
Hammond Ciesar All-Americans players
People from Whiting, Indiana
United States Army Air Forces soldiers
Whiting High School alumni